In Manx folklore, Jimmy Squarefoot is a legendary bipedal pig-headed creature living on the Isle of Man.

Folklore
He had two great tusks like a boar. He is generally a peaceful wanderer.  His large feet are swathed in calico bands and are squarish in appearance. He is thought to have once been ridden by one of the Foawr, a race of stone-throwing giants.

Jimmy Squarefoot is also the name of Monster in My Pocket #80 as well as a character in the 2007 PlayStation 3 video game Folklore.

See also

 Adhene
 Arkan Sonney
 Buggane
 Fenodyree
 Glashtyn
 Moddey Dhoo
 Mooinjer veggey
 Sleih beggey

References

Manx legendary creatures
Mythological pigs